Integrated Encryption Scheme (IES) is a hybrid encryption scheme which provides semantic security against an adversary who is able to use chosen-plaintext or chosen-ciphertext attacks. The security of the scheme is based on the computational Diffie–Hellman problem.
Two variants of IES are specified: Discrete Logarithm Integrated Encryption Scheme (DLIES) and Elliptic Curve Integrated Encryption Scheme (ECIES), which is also known as the Elliptic Curve Augmented Encryption Scheme or simply the Elliptic Curve Encryption Scheme. These two variants are identical up to the change of an underlying group.

Informal description of DLIES
As a brief and informal description and overview of how IES works, a Discrete Logarithm Integrated Encryption Scheme (DLIES) is used, focusing on illuminating the reader's understanding, rather than precise technical details.

 Alice learns Bob's public key  through a public key infrastructure or some other distribution method.Bob knows his own private key .
 Alice generates a fresh, ephemeral value , and its associated public value .
 Alice then computes a symmetric key  using this information and a key derivation function (KDF) as follows: 
 Alice computes her ciphertext  from her actual message  (by symmetric encryption of ) encrypted with the key  (using an authenticated encryption scheme) as follows: 
 Alice transmits (in a single message) both the public ephemeral  and the ciphertext .

Note that the scheme does not provide Bob with any assurance as to who really sent the message: This scheme does nothing to stop anyone from pretending to be Alice.

Formal description of ECIES

Required information
To send an encrypted message to Bob using ECIES, Alice needs the following information:
 The cryptography suite to be used, including a key derivation function (e.g., ANSI-X9.63-KDF with SHA-1 option), a message authentication code (e.g., HMAC-SHA-1-160 with 160-bit keys or HMAC-SHA-1-80 with 80-bit keys) and a symmetric encryption scheme (e.g., TDEA in CBC mode or XOR encryption scheme) — noted .
 Bob's public key , which Bob generates it as follows: , where  is the private key he chooses at random.
 Some optional shared information:  and 
  which denotes the point at infinity.

Encryption
To encrypt a message  Alice does the following:
 generates a random number  and calculates 
 derives a shared secret: , where  (and )
 uses a KDF to derive symmetric encryption keys and MAC keys: 
 encrypts the message: 
 computes the tag of encrypted message and : 
 outputs

Decryption
To decrypt the ciphertext  Bob does the following:
 derives the shared secret: , where  (it is the same as the one Alice derived because ), or outputs failed if 
 derives keys the same way as Alice did: 
 uses MAC to check the tag and outputs failed if 
 uses symmetric encryption scheme to decrypt the message

References
 SECG, Standards for efficient cryptography, SEC 1: Elliptic Curve Cryptography, Version 2.0, May 21, 2009.
 Gayoso Martínez, Hernández Encinas, Sánchez Ávila: A Survey of the Elliptic Curve Integrated Encryption Scheme, Journal of Computer Science and Engineering, 2, 2 (2010), 7–13.
 Ladar Levison: Code for using ECIES to protect data (ECC + AES + SHA), openssl-devel mailing list, August 6, 2010.
 IEEE 1363a (non-public standard) specifies DLIES and ECIES
 ANSI X9.63 (non-public standard)
 ISO/IEC 18033-2 (non-public standard)
 Victor Shoup, A proposal for an ISO standard for public key encryption, Version 2.1, December 20, 2001.
 Abdalla, Michel and Bellare, Mihir and Rogaway, Phillip: DHIES: An Encryption Scheme Based on the Diffie–Hellman Problem, IACR Cryptology ePrint Archive, 1999.

Cryptographic protocols